Federico Pisani (25 July 1974 – 12 February 1997) was an Italian professional footballer who played as a forward for Atalanta and Monza. Pisani died in a car crash on 12 February 1997, and his squad number (#14) was retired as a mark of respect.

Career
Pisani began playing for Atalanta's youth team and after a few years joined the Margine Coperta, a satellite club of Atalanta. Returning to Bergamo, he made his debut in Serie A at the age of 17 years. In the Primavera team, he was coached by Cesare Prandelli and often used as a substitute.

Pisani died in a car accident with his BMW 320 convertible in the company of his girlfriend Alessandra Midali (who also died in the accident) and two friends (who were uninjured) on 12 February 1997. Pisani was returning home after an evening at the casinò di Campione d'Italia.

Following the death of Pisani, Atalanta retired the number 14 jersey. In his short Serie A career, he made 44 appearances and scored five goals.

The main stadium of the Atalanta training centre in Zingonia, and the Curva Nord of the Stadio Atleti Azzurri d'Italia, are both named after him.

References

1974 births
1997 deaths
Italian footballers
Atalanta B.C. players
A.C. Monza players
Road incident deaths in Italy
Serie A players
Association football forwards
People from the Province of Lucca
Footballers from Tuscany